Kim Hart (born 9 May 1960) is a New Zealand singer-songwriter, who had an Australasian hit single in 1980 with "Love at First Night" which reached No.6 on the Australian Kent Music Report.

Biography
Kim Denise Hart was born in Auckland on 9 May 1960. She was the lead vocalist in the Penrose High School Band, Chalkdust, which entered the 1976 Battle of the Bands competition, where they became finalists.

Signed to EMI in 1977 Hart's first single was "You Don't Need Me"/"Born To Wander". This was followed in 1978 with "(You're a) Changed Man"/"You Light Up My Light" and "On My Toes Again"/"How Deep Is Your Love". Hart came second in the New Zealand finals of The South Pacific Song Contest with "On My Toes Again" and she represented New Zealand at the Yamaha Song Festival in Japan.

In 1978 Hart released her debut self-titled album, followed by a new single called "Fly Right Away"/"Blame It on the Sun" and another in early 1979, "Running Around in Circles"/"Love Too Much".

In 1980 Hart released "Love At First Night", which reached number 15 on the New Zealand charts in June. The song was also released in Australia as her debut single there, and it peaked at number 6. Three more singles in 1980.

Hart's final release in Australia was "Heartbeat"/"Don't Give Up" was released on RCA in 1984.

Discography

Albums

Singles

Awards

Aotearoa Music Awards
The Aotearoa Music Awards (previously known as New Zealand Music Awards (NZMA)) are an annual awards night celebrating excellence in New Zealand music and have been presented annually since 1965.

! 
|-
| 1978 || Kim Hart || Most Promising Female ||  || 
|-

References

Living people
20th-century New Zealand women singers
New Zealand women singer-songwriters
1960 births